Species II is a 1998 American science fiction horror thriller film directed by Peter Medak. The film is a sequel to Species (1995) and the second installment in the Species series. The film stars Michael Madsen, Natasha Henstridge, Marg Helgenberger, Mykelti Williamson, George Dzundza, James Cromwell and Justin Lazard. In addition to Madsen and Helgenberger reprising their roles, Henstridge also returned for the sequel as a new character. The plot has Patrick Ross, the astronaut son of a senator, being infected by an extraterrestrial organism during a mission to Mars and causing the deaths of many women upon his return. To stop him, the scientists who created the human-extraterrestrial hybrid Sil in the original Species try using a more docile clone of hers, Eve.

The film was theatrically released on April 10, 1998. It was both a commercial and a critical failure compared to its predecessor, only grossing $26.8 million while having the same production budget as its predecessor. Despite this, a sequel, Species III, was released in 2004, though it was made-for-television.

Plot 
Commander Patrick Ross leads a human mission to Mars. Soil samples collected by the astronauts contain an alien substance which thaws aboard their capsule and contaminates them, causing a brief contact gap with mission control. The three astronauts return to Earth to public celebration, but an institutionalized former scientist, Dr. Cromwell, reacts to their return with violent panic. The three astronauts are examined and quarantined to prevent them from engaging in sexual intercourse for ten days. However, Patrick disregards the advice and sleeps with two women that night. Both women undergo an accelerated pregnancy in which their stomachs split open and half-alien children emerge, killing them. Patrick hides the rapidly growing alien children in a remote shed.

Under military supervision, scientists led by Dr. Laura Baker have created a more docile clone of Sil, named Eve, in an effort to understand the alien life form and prepare for defense should it ever arrive on earth. An isolated Eve, undergoing tests in the lab, shows signs of great physiological excitement every time Patrick has sex with women. At the space center, Patrick sneaks into the lab and kills Dr. Orinsky, who had been trying to contact Dr. Cromwell about the astronauts' blood samples. Analysis of the corpse reveals the presence of alien DNA, similar to, yet distinct from, Eve's. Baker is reunited with Press Lennox to contain the threat. The two contact Cromwell, who explains that Mars was rendered uninhabitable by an alien species, and that he was institutionalized to silence his opposition to the Mars mission. 

Press and Laura find astronaut Anne Sampas, who is also infected with alien DNA. By the time they locate her, she has had unprotected intercourse with her human husband and has become impregnated with alien offspring. Press and Laura kill the creature, but not before it emerges and kills both Anne and her husband. Government agents analyze Dennis Gamble's blood, revealing that he was not infected, and he joins Press and Laura in their mission. After spending the night with his fiancée, Patrick wakes to find her mutilated body and another alien child. Horrified at what he has done, he shoots himself, but his head immediately regenerates and he is reborn as a whole alien. Patrick impregnates as many women as he can, killing them in the process, and burying them next to his shed where he accumulates a large, virulent brood of alien children.

At the lab, the scientists activate Eve's alien DNA to telepathically track Patrick. Patrick also locates Eve and, in order to get closer to her, gives himself up to Press and Dennis. As he enters the lab, Eve shows signs of being in heat. Patrick tries to enter her isolation cell but is chased off by Laura, Dennis, and Press. Patrick then helps his alien children to cocoon, awaiting their rebirth as adults so they can mate with humans, hoping to eventually destroy the entire human population. Meanwhile, Laura finds out that Dennis has resisted infection due to his sickle cell disease, and plans to infect the alien species with Dennis' DNA, as the species lacks immunity to human genetic diseases.

As the team prepares, Eve breaks free from the lab to find Patrick. The team tails her, finds the shed and kills Patrick's brood. Eve and Patrick start to mate and transform into their alien forms, but are interrupted by Press. Patrick fights off Press and Dennis, and overpowers Eve. He then seemingly kills her by forcing his tongue-tentacle down her throat. Press stabs Patrick in the back with a pitchfork coated with Dennis' blood, causing Patrick to disintegrate. The military arrives and escorts Press, Laura and the injured Dennis away. Eve's lifeless human body is loaded into the back of an ambulance. As the vehicle departs, Eve's womb begins to swell, indicating an imminent birth, as one of Patrick's children, who had not yet cocooned, looks on.

Cast
 Natasha Henstridge as Eve
 Michael Madsen as Preston "Press" Lennox
 Marg Helgenberger as Dr. Laura Baker
 James Cromwell as U.S. Senator Judson Ross
 Mykelti Williamson as Dennis Gamble
 Richard Belzer as U.S. President
 Justin Lazard as Patrick Ross
 Sarah Wynter as Melissa
 George Dzundza as Colonel Carter Burgess Jr.
 Myriam Cyr as Anne Sampas
 Peter Boyle as Dr. Herman Cromwell
 Nancy La Scala as Debutante sister Marcy
 Raquel Gardner as Debutante sister Lucy
 Kim Adams as Darlene
 Nicholas Vota as Portus, Boy In Ambulance

Development 
Writer Chris Brancato was working with MGM on The Outer Limits, and knew the studio was interested in making a follow-up to Species. He pitched an idea to executive Greg Foster where this time two hybrid alien women would strike. Foster liked it, but once Brancato went to Species producer Frank Mancuso Jr., he asked to "approach this from a different angle, so that we don't have a tired retread of the original, as sequels often are". So Brancato took inspiration from The Manchurian Candidate, where "somebody on a mission comes back, apparently a hero, but actually with some terrible demon inside", and as "the notion of a grand, unexplored place was the planet Mars", he made the first astronaut on Mars – as according to NASA scientists consulted by Brancato, human exploration of Mars was "a possibility – just a very expensive one" – be infected by alien DNA. Mancuso approved the idea, and thus Brancato explored how this new villain was one "for whom we can briefly feel a strange, Wolf Man-like sympathy – he's not responsible for having been turned into a monster" and had him face an alien woman similar to Sil, raising the doubt on whether they would battle or mate. As Natasha Henstridge was unconfirmed to return, Brancato wrote the new female, Eve, as if it was "either Natasha or a similarly beautiful woman". Henstridge still liked the script enough and the idea of working with director Peter Medak to sign for the sequel. Brancato decided to bring back two of the surviving characters from Species, Michael Madsen's Press Lennox and Marg Helgenberger's Dr. Laura Baker feeling they "were essential to bring the audience back in", but knowing Forest Whitaker was probably too busy to return as Dan Smithson, he wrote a similar African American character in the one eventually portrayed by Mykelti Williamson. Mancuso had another script done simultaneously to Brancato's, which reportedly explored the cliffhanger ending of Species where a rat was infected after eating Sil's remains. Mancuso brought in Peter Medak, responsible for the 1980 horror film The Changeling.

The nature of the alien species is explored to a slightly greater extent in the second film. A professor claims that they originated in the Large Magellanic Cloud (also called the Magellanic Galaxy), due to it apparently being the only other place carbon-based life forms have been discovered. It is also stipulated that they were a "cancerous" race that visited Mars millions of years ago and annihilated all life on its surface (which is described in the film as being Earth-like at that time) before leaving a remnant of their own DNA in its soil. This DNA was intended to be picked up by other visitors so that their species could continue to infect other inhabited planets.

The Species basically appear to be bipedal (humanoid) forms. Unlike other aliens in the Species series, however, Patrick Ross has two types of alien forms: mating form and combat form. Patrick's alien form for copulation is bipedal, humanoid, and male version of Eve's, while Patrick's alien form for combat (so-called 'Fighting Patrick') is quadrupedal, bigger, and more 'brutish' in appearance than Eve. His second stage appearance is also similar to the xenomorphs of the Alien films; both were designed with input from H. R. Giger.

Reception

Box office 
On April 10, 1998 in 2510 theatres, the film finished at $7.2 million, ranking number four on its opening weekend. Domestically, the film grossed only $19.6 million from its $35 million budget and $26,817,565 overseas, making the film average at the box office and therefore was a major critical and commercial failure.

Critical response 
The film received worse reviews than its predecessor. On Rotten Tomatoes it has an approval rating of 9% at based on 33 reviews. The site's critical consensus reads: "Clumsily exploitative and sloppily assembled, Species II fails to clear the rather low bar set by its less-than-stellar predecessor". On Metacritic the film has a score of 19% based on reviews from 13 critics, indicating "overwhelming dislike". Audiences polled by CinemaScore gave the film an average grade of "C" on an A+ to F scale. At the 1998 Stinkers Bad Movie Awards, the film was nominated for Worst Sequel but lost to I Still Know What You Did Last Summer.

Dwayne E. Leslie from Box Office Magazine gave the film 1 out of 5 stars calling it "a sequel that doesn't measure up", also heavily criticizing the film's predictable and open ending. Joe Leydon from Variety magazine called the film "a half-baked rehash". He praised the special effects and technical aspects of the film but added "that's not nearly enough to camouflage the inherent crumminess". James Berardinelli described the film as awful but added "there's enough blood, gore, simulated sex, and bare flesh to prevent it from ever becoming boring".

In a 2004 interview, co-star Michael Madsen expressed his opinion on this film saying that "Species II was a crock of shit. There are a number I'm not very proud of. The movie studios can't mind that much, as they haven't contacted me to tell me off about it. I'm honest – if I've made a bad movie, I want my fans to know what they're letting themselves in for".

In the DVD commentary director Peter Medak praised the films' special effects. He expressed his opinion that audiences had too much expectation as this was a very different sequel due to not continuing from the story with the alien-infected rat that survived the finale, which hinted at a sequel in the 1995 original. Medak also admitted being uncomfortable with the amount of nudity in the film but said it was for the purpose of the story.

Merchandise 
To coincide with the film, McFarlane Toys released an Eve and Patrick (in their alien form) action figure as part of their inaugural series of Movie Maniacs action figures. Both action figures came with a replica of the film's poster with skulls and bones base. Eve came with an alternate head. Two Eve action figures were produced which was dubbed the PG and R rated version. The R rated Eve action figure (in her alien form) had nipples on her breasts while the PG figure didn't. The R rated figure was released only in comic book and other collectable stores while the PG figure was released in toy stores.

The film's soundtrack on CD includes a track by B.B. King, one by Apollo 440, and 9 score pieces composed by Edward Shearmur.

Novelization 

As with the first film, Yvonne Navarro wrote a novelization based on the original screenplay which gives plot and character details not seen in the film. For example, the book tells how, due to limited knowledge of the outside world, Eve does not know if Superman is a real life personality or not. It is also hinted that she was able to learn a degree of martial arts by watching old action movies.

In the film, Eve is shot by soldiers, but after being briefly incapacitated her body regenerates and she continues to escape. Soldiers continue to shoot at her, but Eve manages to run past them; why she is unharmed is left unexplained. The book explains that her skin adapts (in a way similar to how her body adapts to the gas test earlier in the film), becoming bulletproof.

Other details in the book that do not appear in the film include an earlier escape attempt by Eve, and Patrick discovering new senses in a restaurant with his fiancé. In the novel, the debutante is a young, sexy, brown-eyed blonde, whereas in the film, she is an older woman who is a brunette. The debutante's sister in the novel isn't her sister but her best friend from college who often engaged in sexual games that involved seducing men.

The order of events in the novel differs from their order in the movie. For example, Patrick does not encounter the debutante at the fundraiser until after Orinsky is killed by him, and Cromwell is not visited by Laura and Press until they discover Orinsky's corpse.

See also 
 Alien
 Life
 List of films set on Mars

References

External links 
 
 

1998 films
1998 horror films
1990s science fiction horror films
American science fiction thriller films
American science fiction horror films
Large Magellanic Cloud in fiction
Species (film series)
American sequel films
1990s monster movies
1998 action thriller films
American action thriller films
American chase films
American splatter films
Films scored by Edward Shearmur
Films about astronauts
Films about cloning
Films directed by Peter Medak
Films shot in Baltimore
Mars in film
Metro-Goldwyn-Mayer films
Patricide in fiction
American monster movies
Biological weapons in popular culture
American pregnancy films
1990s pregnancy films
1990s English-language films
1990s American films